Ocenebra inornata common names the "Asian drill", the "Asian oyster drill", the "Japanese oyster drill" and the "Japanese oyster borer", is a species of small predatory sea snail, a marine gastropod mollusk in the family Muricidae, the murex snails or rock snails.

This species is native to Asia (Japan and Korea), but it has become a notorious introduced pest species in oyster beds in the western USA and Europe.

Description

Distribution

References

 Tryon, G.W. Jr. (1880) Muricinae, Purpurinae. Manual of Conchology, Structural and Systematic, with Illustrations of the Species. Vol. 2. Tryon, Philadelphia, 289 pp., 70 pls. page(s): 256
 Houart R. & Sirenko B.I. (2003) Review of the Recent species of Ocenebra Gray, 1847 and Ocinebrellus Jousseaume, 1880 in the Northwestern Pacific. Ruthenica 13(1): 53–74.
 Streftaris, N.; Zenetos, A.; Papathanassiou, E. (2005). Globalisation in marine ecosystems: the story of non-indigenous marine species across European seas. Oceanogr. Mar. Biol. Annu. Rev. 43: 419-453
 Houart R. (2011) Ocenebra, Pteropurpura, and Ocinebrellus (Gastropoda: Muricidae: Ocenebrinae) in the northwestern Pacific. American Conchologist 39(4): 12–22.

Ocenebra
Gastropods described in 1851